The 1971 Coupe de France Final was an association football match held at Stade Olympique Yves-du-Manoir, Colombes on 20 June  1971. Stade Rennais defeated Olympique Lyonnais 1–0, thanks to a goal by André Guy.

Match Summary
In an overall average game opposing two teams disposed in a 4-4-2 formation, the break came from a penalty kick scored by ex-Lyon player André Guy, who had transferred to Rennes in December 1970, after a questionable foul by Robert Valette. The referee, Mr. Vigilani had previously disallowed a goal by André Betta in the 58th minute for Rennes due to an offside position by Robert Rico.

This win was Rennes' second Coupe de France victory, their first win having come in the 1965 final against Sedan-Torcy. Lyon, suffered their second defeat in the final in the fourth Coupe de France Final appearance, the first loss having been against AS Monaco in 1963.

This was the last Coupe de France final to be played at the Stade Olympique Yves-du-Manoir in Colombes, as the final was played at the Parc des Princes from 1972 to 1997, and since 1998 has been played at the Stade de France.

Match details

See also
 1970–71 Coupe de France

References

External links
Coupe de France results at Rec.Sport.Soccer Statistics Foundation
Report on French federation site

1971
Coupe De France Final 1971
Coupe De France Final 1971
Coupe
Coupe de France Final
Sport in Hauts-de-Seine
Coupe de France Final